Deh Ali-ye Asfyj (also Romanized as Deh ‘Alī-ye Āsfyj; also known as Deh ‘Alī and Deh-e ‘Alī) is a village in Asfyj Rural District, Asfyj District, Behabad County, Yazd Province, Iran. At the 2006 census, its population was 98, in 23 families.

References 

Populated places in Behabad County